Längre inåt landet is the fifth studio album by Swedish rock artist Ulf Lundell and was released on September 12, 1980, through Parlophone. It was produced by Lasse Lindbom, Ulf Lundell and Kjell Andersson. The album was Lundell's first double album.

It was recorded at Ridge Farm in Surrey in southern England, and contains songs like "Stackars Jack" ("Poor Jack") and "Glad igen" ("Happy Again") who kept up with the live repertoire throughout the years. The latter is an interpretation of the Joni Mitchell song "Carey". On the LP release, track number 8 on the second disc is hidden. It is a recording of "Som en syster" ("Like a Sister") from the live album "Natten hade varit mild och öm" from 1977.

The album was reissued in 1999 in a remastered version with three extra tracks, one of which is an interpretation of Bob Dylan's song "Just like a woman."

Track listing

Personnel
 Ulf Lundell - guitar, piano, harmonica
 Janne Andersson - guitar
 Ingemar Dunker - drums
 Lasse Lindbom - bass, choir
 Mats Ronander - guitar, munspel, choir
 Niklas Strömstedt - piano, Vox-orgel, choir
 Speedy Keen - guitar solo
 Hasse Olsson - Hammond-orgel

Charts

References

1980 albums
Ulf Lundell albums